Grit Wins is a 1929 American silent Western film directed by Joseph Levigard and written by George H. Plympton and Carl Krusada. The film stars Ted Wells, Kathleen Collins, Al Ferguson, Buck Connors, Nelson McDowell and Buck Moulton. The film was released on January 27, 1929, by Universal Pictures.

Plot

Cast      
 Ted Wells as Jack Deering
 Kathleen Collins as Nan Pickens
 Al Ferguson as Logan
 Buck Connors as Ted Pickens
 Nelson McDowell as John Deering
 Buck Moulton as Jake

References

External links
 

1929 films
1929 Western (genre) films
American black-and-white films
Silent American Western (genre) films
Universal Pictures films
Films with screenplays by George H. Plympton
1920s English-language films
1920s American films